Tortkol may refer to:
 Tortkol, Uzbekistan
 Tortkol, Kazakhstan